Kinton is a hamlet in Shropshire, England.

It is part of the civil parish of Great Ness, and is situated to the west of the A5 road.

Richard Mathews, the father of Oliver Mathews – the first historian of Shrewsbury – lived in Kinton.

References

External links

Villages in Shropshire